The 2019 Mayo Senior Football Championship was the 118th edition of the Mayo GAA's premier gaelic football tournament for senior clubs in County Mayo, Ireland. Sixteen teams competed with the winners going on to represent Mayo in the Connacht Senior Club Football Championship. The championship started with a group stage and progressed to a knock out stage. The winners received the Paddy Moclair Cup.

Belmullet returned to the top-flight for the first time in over 40 years (they last claimed the I.F.C. title in 1974), having claimed the 2018 Mayo Intermediate Football Championship title with a final victory over Burrishoole.

Ballintubber were the defending champions after they defeated Breaffy in the 2018 final. They successfully defended their title and claimed a "2-in-a-row" of Paddy Moclair Cups and their 5th overall when defeating Ballaghaderreen in the final at McHale Park. 

Hollymount-Carramore were relegated to the 2020 I.F.C. after 4 seasons in the top-flight of Mayo football when losing their Relegation Final to Moy Davitts.

Team Changes

As 2018 Intermediate Champions, Belmullet were promoted to the Senior Championship for 2019. They took the place of Crossmolina Deel Rovers, who were relegated from the 2019 I.F.C. at the end of the 2018 season.

Clubs
The 2019 Championship was contested by 16 clubs: 4 of them from South Mayo, 4 from North Mayo, 4 from West Mayo, 4 from East Mayo.

Group stage
All 16 teams entered the competition at this stage. The top 2 teams in each group qualified for the quarter-finals while the bottom team of each group entered a Relegation Playoff. All teams played one home match, one away match and one match at a neutral venue. In the event of two teams finishing on the same points total, placings were decided by head-to-head record between the teams, then by scoring difference.

Group 1

Round 1 
 Davitts 0-7, 1-10 Breaffy, 13/4/2019,
 Kiltane 0-7, 0-6 Moy Davitts, 13/4/2019,

Round 2
 Moy Davitts 0-9, 2-12 Davitts, 24/8/2019,
 Breaffy 0-22, 0-12 Kiltane, 25/8/2019,

Round 3
 Breaffy 1-17, 0-8 Moy Davitts, Charlestown, 7/9/2019,
 Davitts 3-14, 2-8 Kiltane, McHale Park, 7/9/2019,

Group 2

Round 1 
 Castlebar Mitchels 0-12, 1-9 Ballina Stephenites, 13/4/2019,
 Aghamore 1-5, 0-8 Westport, 13/4/2019,

Round 2
 Westport 0-10, 0-14 Castlebar Mitchels, 24/8/2019,
 Ballina Stephenites 1-9, 0-12 Aghamore, 24/8/2019,

Round 3
 Ballina Stephenites 1-14, 0-11 Westport, McHale Park, 7/9/2019,
 Castlebar Mitchels 0-11, 0-9 Aghamore, Claremorris, 7/9/2019,

Group 3

Round 1 
 Hollymount-Carramore 1-3, 0-18 Ballintubber, 13/4/2019,
 Knockmore 1-9, 1-5 Garrymore, 13/4/2019,Round 2 Ballintubber 2-10, 1-8 Knockmore, 24/8/2019,
 Garrymore 1-11, 0-14 Hollymount-Carramore, 25/8/2019,Round 3 Garrymore 2-12, 1-12 Ballintubber, Ballinrobe, 7/9/2019,
 Knockmore 2-14, 2-9 Hollymount-Carramore, Charlestown, 7/9/2019,

Group 4Round 1 
 Ballaghaderreen 2-10, 1-12 Claremorris, 13/4/2019,
 Belmullet 0-8, 0-7 Charlestown Sarsfields, 13/4/2019,Round 2 Charlestown Sarsfields 0-12, 2-8 Ballaghaderreen, 24/8/2019,
 Claremorris 0-13, 2-13 Belmullet, 25/8/2019,Round 3 Ballaghaderreen 1-13, 0-13 Belmullet, Ballina, 8/9/2019,
 Charlestown Sarsfields 1-14''', 0-16 Claremorris, Aghamore, 8/9/2019,

Knock-Out Stage

Quarter-finals

Semi-finals

Final

Relegation Playoffs
The four teams who finished bottom of their groups entered the relegation play-offs, with the two losers of the semi-finals meeting in the relegation play-off final. All games are played at neutral venues.

Relegation Semi-Finals

Relegation Final

Awards

Notes

References

External links

Mayo Senior Football Championship
Mayo Senior Football Championship
Mayo Senior Football Championship
Mayo SFC